SpaceX routinely lands boosters of its Falcon 9 and Falcon Heavy rockets, either on a landing zone on the ground or on a drone ship.

SpaceX landing zones are:

 SpaceX Landing Complex 1 (LC-1), USSF Cape Canaveral Space Force Station, Space Coast, Florida, USA
 SpaceX Landing Zone 1 (LZ-1)
 SpaceX Landing Zone 2 (LZ-2)
 SpaceX Landing Zone 4 (LZ-4), USSF Vandenberg Space Force Base, California, USA

See also
 Autonomous spaceport drone ship (SpaceX ASDS)
 SpaceX launch facilities
 Floating landing platform
 Landing zone

SpaceX facilities